The 2018 WFG Tankard, the Quebec men's provincial curling championship was held from February 4 to 11 at the Glenmore Curling Club in Dollard-des-Ormeaux, Quebec. The winning Mike Fournier team represented Quebec at the 2018 Tim Hortons Brier in Regina, Saskatchewan.

Teams
Teams are as follows

Round robin standings
Final Round Robin Standings

Round Robin Results
Scores

Draw 1
Sunday, February 4, 16:30

Draw 2
Sunday, February 4, 20:30

Draw 3
Monday, February 5, 10:00

Draw 4
Monday, February 5, 14:30

Draw 5
Monday, February 5, 19:00

Draw 6
Tuesday, February 6, 10:00

Draw 7
Tuesday, February 6, 14:30

Draw 8
Tuesday, February 6, 19:00

Draw 9
Wednesday, February 7, 10:00

Draw 10
Wednesday, February 7, 14:30

Draw 11
Wednesday, February 7, 19:00

Tiebreakers
Thursday, February 8, 10:00

Championship Round
Final Standings

Draw 13
Thursday, February 8, 14:30

Draw 14
Thursday, February 8, 19:30

Draw 15
Friday, February 9, 10:00

Playoffs

1 vs 2
Friday, February 9, 19:30

3 vs 4
Saturday, February 10, 10:00

Semifinal
Saturday, February 10, 19:30

Final
Sunday, February 11, 12:00

References

Quebec Men's Provincial Curling Championship
Curling in Quebec
Quebec Men's Provincial
February 2018 sports events in Canada
Dollard-des-Ormeaux